Majid Majidi (born 17 April 1959) is an Iranian film director, producer, and screenwriter, who started his film career as an actor. In his films, Majidi has touched on many themes and genres and has won numerous international awards.

Biography
Born in an Iranian middle-class family, he grew up in Tehran and at the age of 14 he started acting in amateur theater groups. He then studied at the Institute of Dramatic Arts in Tehran.

After the Iranian Revolution in 1979, his interest in cinema brought him to act in various films, most notably Mohsen Makhmalbaf's Boycott in 1985.

In 1997, Majidi directed Children of Heaven, which was nominated to receive the Academy Award for Best Foreign Language Film. Though it lost to the Italian film Life Is Beautiful by Roberto Benigni, Children of Heaven is the first Iranian film to have been nominated by the academy.

Majidi has directed several other feature films since Children of Heaven: The Color of Paradise in 2000, Baran in 2001, and The Willow Tree in 2005 (alternate English title One Life More). He also recently directed a feature-length documentary titled Barefoot to Herat which chronicles life in refugee camps and the city of Herat during and after the anti-Taliban offensive of 2001.

In 2008, Majidi's acclaimed film The Song of Sparrows was the opening film of the Visakhapatnam International Film Festival in India.

Majid Majidi was one of five international film directors invited by the Beijing government to create a documentary short film to introduce the city of Beijing, in preparation for the 2008 Summer Olympics which was held in the Chinese capital; the project was titled "Vision Beijing".

Majidi pulled out of a Danish film festival in protest against the publication in Denmark of cartoons satirizing the Islamic prophet, Muhammad. Majidi stated that he was withdrawing "to protest against insulting any religious belief or icon". Majidi writes, "I believe in God and live with my beliefs in every single moment of my life. I would like to protest against insulting any religious belief and icon. For this reason, I would like to announce my withdrawal from your festival."

Filmography
Director

Film

Shorts/documentaries
 Explosion (Enfejar) (1981) - documentary short
 Hoodaj (1984) - short
 Examination Day (Rooz-e Emtehan) (1988) - short
 A Day with POWs (Yek Rooz Ba Asiran) (1989) - documentary short
 The Last Village (Akhareen Abadi) (1993) - short
 God Will Come (Khoda Miayad) (1996) - short
 Barefoot to Herat (Pa berahneh ta Herat) (2002) - documentary
 Olympics in the Camp (Olympik Tu Urdugah) (2003) - documentary short
 Peace, Love, and Friendship (2007) - documentary short
 Vision of Beijing (2008) - short
 Rezae Rezvan (2007) - documentary
 Najva ashorai (2008) - documentary

Awards and honors
Majid Majidi has received numerous awards up to now. Here are a few:
Grand Prix Des Ameriques, 21st Montreal Film Festival, 1997.
Ecumenical Jury award, 21st Montreal Film Festival, 1997.
Nominated for Academy Awards for Best Foreign Film, 1998.
Grand Prix Des Ameriques, 23rd Montreal Film Festival, 1999.
Grand Prix Des Ameriques, 25th Montreal Film Festival, 2001.

References

External links
Unofficial website run by his fan Fouad Nahas

Iranian film directors
Iranian screenwriters
Iranian male film actors
Persian-language film directors
People from Tehran
Crystal Simorgh for Best Director winners
Living people
1959 births
Producers who won the Best Film Crystal Simorgh
Crystal Simorgh for Best Screenplay winners
Producers who won the Audience Choice of Best Film Crystal Simorgh